The 2003 Grand Prix de Denain was the 45th edition of the Grand Prix de Denain cycle race and was held on 17 April 2003. The race was won by Bert Roesems.

General classification

References

2003
2003 in road cycling
2003 in French sport
April 2003 sports events in France